Bakovac Kosinjski is a village in the municipality of Perušić in Lika-Senj County, Croatia.

History
Bakovac Kosinjski was a settlement of the mediaeval Buško clan of Ljupčoć; three plates with Glagolitic inscriptions and the coat of arms of the Frankopan counts have been found in the ruins of the old chapel.

Church

Church of St. Vitus

Populated places in Lika-Senj County